Streptomyces subrutilus is a bacterium species from the genus of Streptomyces. Streptomyces subrutilus produces deoxynojirimycin, deoxymannonojirimycin and hydroxystreptomycin.

See also 
 List of Streptomyces species

References

Further reading

External links
Type strain of Streptomyces subrutilus at BacDive -  the Bacterial Diversity Metadatabase	

subrutilus
Bacteria described in 1964